Shevlin was an unincorporated community in Deschutes and Klamath counties in the U.S. state of Oregon. It consisted of a collection of logging camp buildings that were moved from place to place on rail cars as logging progressed. The loggers worked for the Shevlin–Hixson Company.

Background
The community then moved to Summit Stage Station on Oregon Route 31 in northeastern Klamath County near its border with Lake County. The Geographic Names Information System places the community in the Fremont–Winema National Forest southeast of Chemult.

Shevlin post office opened in 1931 with William J. Baer as the first postmaster. By 1936, the post office had moved to Klamath County, where it continued until 1951. After that, mail to Shevlin went to the post office in Chemult.

References

Unincorporated communities in Klamath County, Oregon
Unincorporated communities in Oregon